Frank Preston Stearns (1846–1917), the son of abolitionist George Luther Stearns,  was a writer and abolitionist from Massachusetts during the 19th century. In addition to collaborating with Elizur Wright in ambitious abolitionist projects, such as the American Anti-Slavery Society, he is credited with several seminal works exploring the lives and careers of important American public figures and authors of note, including The Life and Genius of Nathaniel Hawthorne, The Life of Prince Otto von Bismarck, and The Life and Public Services of George Luther Stearns.

Biography
Frank Preston Stearns was born in Medford, Massachusetts on January 4, 1846.

He married Emilia Maciel on September 28, 1898, and they had one child.

He died from a cerebral hemorrhage in Arlington, Massachusetts on January 21, 1917.

References

External links
 
 

Cambridge Sketches: The Colored Regiments

American abolitionists
People from Massachusetts
1846 births
1917 deaths